Serfozo is a surname. Notable people with the surname include:

András Serfőző (1950–2021), Hungarian politician
Gavril Serfözö (1926–2002), Romanian footballer